The 2021 Big West Conference women's soccer tournament was the postseason women's soccer tournament for the Big West Conference held on November 4 and 7, 2021. The three-match tournament took place at Anteater Stadium in Irvine, California. The four-team single-elimination tournament consisted of two rounds based on seeding from regular season conference play. The defending champions were the Cal State Fullerton Titans.  The Titans won the tournament in 2019 and are classified as the defending champions because there was no tournament held in 2020 due to the COVID-19 pandemic. Cal State Fullerton was unable to defend its crown, falling to Cal Poly in the Semifinals.  The UC Irvine Anteaters won the title by defeating Cal Poly 1–0 in the final.  This was the second Big West tournament title for the UC Irvine program and the first for head coach Scott Juniper. As tournament champions, UC Irvine earned the Big West's automatic berth into the 2021 NCAA Division I Women's Soccer Tournament.

Seeding 
Four Big West schools participated in the tournament. Teams were seeded by conference record.  A tiebreaker was required to determine which school would be selected as the number one seed, and tournament host.  UC Irvine and Cal Poly both finished the season with twenty four points, but UC Irvine was awarded the top seed by virtue of their 2–0 win over Cal Poly on October 31.  A tiebreaker was also required to determine the fourth team in the tournament after both UC Santa Barbara and Long Beach State after both teams finished the season with nineteen points.  UC Santa Barbara defeated Long Beach State 2–1 on October 31, and therefore were awarded the fourth seed.

Bracket

Source:

Schedule

Semifinals

Final

Statistics

Goalscorers

References 

Big West Conference Women's Soccer Tournament
2021 Big West Conference women's soccer season